Universidad César Vallejo is the women's volleyball club based in Trujillo, Peru. The team take its name from the Cesar Vallejo University.

History

2012/13 season
The team hired the junior female National Team Natalia Malaga and the international Peruvian players Milagros Moy and Verónica Contreras to play along with Dominicans Marianne Fersola and Sidarka Núñez. The season ended with the club winning the league championship and qualifying for the South American Club Championship. Milagros Moy won the Most Valuable Player award. The club lost to Unilever the first place of the South American Club tournament, settling with the silver medal.

Current squad
Squad as of the 2017-18 LNSV

Technical and managerial staff
The club is managed by Kelly Acuña. daughter of the manager for the soccer club of the same name, César Acuña.

Squad as of December, 2012

Women’s volleyball

National
Liga Nacional Superior de Voleibol: 
Winners (1): 2012–13

International
Women's South American Volleyball Club Championship: 
 Runner-up (1): 2013

References

Peruvian volleyball clubs
Sport in Lima